The Shakey's V-League 9th Season: 1st Conference is the sixteenth conference of Shakey's V-League, a collegiate women's volleyball league in the Philippines founded in 2004. The opening ceremonies was held on April 24, 2012, with the first doubleheader of volleyball games at the Filoil Flying V Arena in San Juan. After a two-year hiatus, the Tigresses of the University of Santo Tomas, the winningest team of the league, participates the conference with other nine teams.

At the end of the elimination round, the Lady Eagles of the Ateneo de Manila University and the Tigresses of the University of Santo Tomas (UST) emerged on the top of standings in their respective group via complete sweep 4–0.

The Ateneo Lady Eagles had the distinction of sweeping the quarterfinals 8–0, capped by a win against UST Tigresses (3–1) on their last quarterfinal game. The UST Tigresses snagged a solo second spot after beating  in straight sets on the last day of quarterfinals. The  and  ended the round third and fourth, respectively, and the former faced UST while the latter battled with Ateneo in the best-of-three series semifinals of the conference.

In semifinals, Ateneo swept UPHSD 2–0 to formalize their entry to the Finals. On the other side, San Sebastian forced a rubber match but UST won in three straight sets on the deciding game to face Ateneo in their first Finals meeting.

Participants 
The conference is composed of 10 teams, grouped into two pools, each consisting of five squads.

Tournament format 
The tournament format for first conference of Shakey's V-League ninth season are as follows:
 During elimination round, teams will only play against teams in their pool in a single round-robin schedule.
 At the end of the eliminations, the top four teams in each pool will advance to the quarterfinal round. The qualifiers for the quarterfinals will be grouped into one. Team standings during eliminations will be carried over into the quarterfinal round. Qualified teams of Pool A will only play against teams of the other pool, Pool B in a single round-robin schedule, and vice versa.
 The top four teams in quarterfinal standings will advance to the best-of-three series semifinal round. Seed #1 team meets #4, while #2 meets #3.
 Winners of the semifinals will battle in a best-of-three series Finals, while losers will play for a best-of-three series bronze medal game.

Elimination round 
 All times are local (UTC+8). All games were held at Filoil Flying V Arena, San Juan.

In the elimination round, each group played a round-robin schedule, with each team playing every other team. The top four teams advanced to the second round.

Group A 
Group A featured Ateneo, FEU, NU, SWU, and UPHSD. Ateneo won all its matches, while SWU was eliminated after going 0–4.

|}

Group B 
Group B featured the league's winningest team, the UST, as well as Adamson, Letran, San Sebastian, and USLS. UST won all four of its matches. Letran was defeated in every match and was eliminated from the competition.

|}

Bracket

Quarterfinals 
 All times are local (UTC+8). All games are held at Filoil Flying V Arena, San Juan.

In quarterfinals, the qualifiers are grouped into one. Team standings during eliminations will be carried over into the quarterfinal round. Qualified teams of Group A will only play against teams of the other pool, Group B, in a single round-robin schedule, and vice versa.

|}

Semifinals 
 All times are local (UTC+08:00).

Ateneo vs. UPHSD

UST vs. San Sebastian

Bronze medal series

Finals

Final standings

Individual awards 
The Shakey's V-League awarded the outstanding players of the conference prior to Game 1 of the Finals of Shakey's V-League 9th Season 1st Conference at Filoil Flying V Arena in San Juan.
 Best Scorer: Jaroensri Bualee, San Sebastian College – Recoletos de Manila
 Best Attacker: Utaiwan Kaensing, University of Santo Tomas
 Best Blocker: Lithawat Kesinee, Ateneo de Manila University
 Best Server: Judy Caballejo, University of Santo Tomas
 Best Digger: Angelique Beatrice Dionela, University of Perpetual Help System DALTA
 Best Setter: Jamenea Ferrer, Ateneo de Manila University
 Best Receiver: Dennise Michelle Lazaro, Ateneo de Manila University
 Most Improved Player: Sandra delos Santos, University of Perpetual Help System DALTA
 Most Valuable Player of the Conference: Jaroensri Bualee, San Sebastian College – Recoletos de Manila
 Most Valuable Player of the Finals: Alyssa Valdez, Ateneo de Manila University

References

See also 
 2012 Filoil Flying V Preseason Hanes Cup

Shakey's V-League conferences
College women's volleyball tournaments in the Philippines
2012 in volleyball
2012 in Philippine sport